Lewis Watson (June 25, 1895 – May 19, 1961) was an American athlete. He competed in the men's individual cross country event at the 1920 Summer Olympics.

References

External links
 

1895 births
1961 deaths
Athletes (track and field) at the 1920 Summer Olympics
American male long-distance runners
Olympic track and field athletes of the United States
Sportspeople from New Britain, Connecticut
Olympic cross country runners
20th-century American people